Rahelty is a townland of 298 acres in the civil parish of Ballinamara in the barony of Cranagh in County Kilkenny, Ireland.

It is located a few miles to the north-west of Kilkenny City.

Townlands of County Kilkenny